As a nickname, The Snake or Snake may refer to:

Athletes  
 Phil Baker (footballer) (born 1952), former Australian rules footballer
 Nate Bowman (1943–1984), American Basketball Association and National Basketball Association player
 Barry Fry (curler) (1939–2021), Canadian curler
 Nate Jones (boxer) (born 1972), American former Olympic and professional boxer
 Milan Jovanović (footballer, born 1981), Serbian former footballer
 Marco McDonald (born 1977), Jamaican footballer
 Ken Norman (born 1964), American retired National Basketball Association player
 Sino Nyoka (born 1990), South African rugby union player
 Jacques Plante (1929–1986), Canadian Hall-of-Fame National Hockey League goaltender
 Jake Plummer (born 1974), American retired National Football League quarterback
 Don Prudhomme (born 1941), American drag racer
 Jerry Scanlan (1957–2015), American former football player
 James Silas (born 1949), retired American Basketball Association and National Basketball Association player
 Ken Stabler (1945–2015), American retired National Football League quarterback
 Tom Sturdivant (1930–2009), American Major League Baseball pitcher
 Snake Wiltse (1871–1928), American Major League Baseball pitcher

Gangsters 
 Thomas Kinney (1868–1912), Missouri state senator and gangster
 Carmine Persico (1933–2019), boss of the Colombo crime family in New York City

Soldiers 
 Dennis Chalker (born 1954), American retired US Navy SEAL, inventor and author
 Joseph Cheesman Thompson (1874–1943), US Navy medical officer and polymath
 Bruce P. Crandall (born 1933), retired US Army soldier awarded the Medal of Honor

See also 

 Sergio Mora (born 1980), Mexican-American former world champion boxer nicknamed "The Latin Snake"
 Donnie Nietes (born 1982), Filipino world champion boxer nicknamed "Ahas" (Tagalog for "Snake")

Lists of people by nickname